Hey Babe is the debut solo album by American musician Juliana Hatfield, released in 1992.

Track listing

Personnel
Credits adapted from CD liner notes.

 Juliana Hatfield – vocals (all tracks), guitar (2-11), bass guitar (1-6, 8, 9, 11), "horns" (2)
 Evan Dando – guitar (1, 4), vocals (1, 2)
 Chick Graning – slide guitar (8), EBow (8)
 Mike Leahy – guitar (1, 2, 4, 6, 10, 11)
 Gary Smith – guitar (6)
 Clay Tarver – guitar (5, 10)
 Paul Trudeau – drums (3, 8, 9)
 Michael Wegner – guitar (8, 9)
 Mike Watt – bass (10)
 Todd Philips – drums (1, 2, 4-6, 10, 11)
 John Wesley Harding – vocals (2, 3)

Production
 Gary Smith – producer
 Steve Balcom – executive producer
 Jay Faires – executive producer
 Adam Lasus – engineer
 Carl Plaster – engineer
 Paul Q. Kolderie – mixing
 Sean Slade – mixing
 Greg Calbi – mastering

References

Juliana Hatfield albums
1992 debut albums
Albums produced by Gary Smith (record producer)
Mammoth Records albums